Manuel Herrick nicknamed the "Okie Jesus Congressman" (September 20, 1876 – January 11, 1952) was a United States Representative from Oklahoma for one term, from March 4, 1921 to March 3, 1923.

Early life
Born Emanuel Herrick in Perry Township, Tuscarawas County, Ohio on September 20, 1876, he moved with his parents, John Emanuel Herrick and Belinda Kale Herrick, to Greenwood County, Kansas in 1877. Herrick was self-educated and engaged in agricultural pursuits. Later, he settled in the Cherokee Strip in Oklahoma Territory. In 1893, Herrick moved to Perry and became interested in agriculture and stock raising.

Congressional career
At the age of forty-two, Herrick was elected as a Republican to the Sixty-seventh Congress. Herrick won the Republican nomination after the popular incumbent Republican congressman, Dick T. Morgan, died unexpectedly on the last day of filing, allowing Herrick to take the nomination unopposed. Herrick was elected in November 1920 based on the strength of Warren G. Harding's showing in his district. Herrick served from March 4, 1921 to March 3, 1923. He unsuccessfully ran for reelection in 1922, losing in the Republican primary. As a Congressman, Herrick was one of the more colorful members of that body. During his one-and-only term, Herrick scandalized his fellow legislators by soliciting marriage proposals from beauty queens, only to claim that he was gathering information for intended legislation banning beauty pageants. Herrick took a similar approach to his 1925 arrest for moonshining, claiming to be an undercover agent for the Internal Revenue Service. Herrick was also notable for his prowess as a barnstorming aviator, and for claiming to be Jesus Christ reborn (his given name was Immanuel). His mental health was often in question and his eccentricities and lack of knowledge of the governmental process overshadowed his diligence for constituents.

Later life and death
After leaving Congress, Herrick moved to California in 1933. He would settle in Plumas County, California in 1937 and ran unsuccessfully for Congress several times while in California. Herrick mysteriously disappeared during a Sierra blizzard on January 11, 1952, while on a trip to his mining claim eight miles northeast of Quincy, California. A month later, Herrick was found dead in a snowbank two miles from his cabin on February 29, 1952. His remains were cremated and the ashes interred in Quincy Cemetery in Quincy.

Bibliography
Aldrich, Gene. Okie Jesus Congressman (The Life of Manuel Herrick). Oklahoma City: Times-Journal Publishing Co., 1974.

References

A Hundred Years of Oklahoma and the Congress: World War I and the Roaring Twenties

External links

Oklahoma Encyclopedia of History & Culture - Herrick, Manuel

1876 births
1952 deaths
People from Tuscarawas County, Ohio
People from Plumas County, California
Farmers from Oklahoma
Republican Party members of the United States House of Representatives from Oklahoma